The 1892 Gonzaga Blue and White football team was an American football team that represented Gonzaga University during the 1892 college football season. In their first season they played one game, a 4–4 tie against the Spokane A.C. on Thanksgiving day (November 24). Their head coach was Henry Luhn.

There were 500 people in attendance for the game. The length of the game was two 35 minute halves while the players had 3 downs to get 5 yards.

Schedule

References

Gonzaga
Gonzaga Bulldogs football seasons
Gonzaga Blue and White football